Psychristus is a genus of beetles in the family Carabidae, containing the following species:

 Psychristus accessor Wrase, 1997 
 Psychristus amicorum Jaeger, 1997 
 Psychristus andrewesi Jaeger, 1997 
 Psychristus belkab Wrase & Kataev, 2009 
 Psychristus brunneus Jaeger, 2009 
 Psychristus consimilis Jaeger, 1997 
 Psychristus cooteri Wrase & Kataev, 2009 
 Psychristus curvus Wrase, 1997 
 Psychristus dentatus Jaeger, 2009 
 Psychristus discretus Andrewes, 1930 
 Psychristus glaber Jaeger & Wrase, 2007 
 Psychristus hubeicus Wrase & Kataev, 2009 
 Psychristus lewisi (Schauberger, 1933) 
 Psychristus liparops Andrewes, 1930 
 Psychristus longyangensis Wrase & Kataev, 2009 
 Psychristus magnus Wrase & Kataev, 2009 
 Psychristus schmidti Jaeger & Wrase, 2007 
 Psychristus schuekei Wrase & Kataev, 2009 
 Psychristus shibatai (N.Ito, 1985) 
 Psychristus sichuanensis Wrase & Jaeger, 1995 
 Psychristus umbraticornis Jaeger & Wrase, 2007

References

Harpalinae